Lrytas.lt is one of the largest Lithuanian news portals with audience of 1 million visitors per month on the Internet and more than 300,000 visitors on mobile. It is part of the Lietuvos Rytas Media Group.
The news portal lrytas. lt offers the possibility to read the largest Lithuanian daily  Lietuvos Rytas for free.

Company development 
Lrytas.lt started its operation in 1997 as the online mirror copy of  "Lietuvos rytas" daily. In 2006, it became a separate news website company. Online video services took place in June 2008 and later evolved to a separate co-site: lrytas.tv. Lrytas.tv is the most popular online television in Lithuania. It offers real-time streaming of the Lietuvos Rytas television and exceptional reports exclusively for lrytas. lt readers.

Co-sites 
Lrytas.lt consists of several subportals: online TV (tv.lrytas.lt), Bendraukime (citizen journalism), Augintinis (animals), Receptai (recipes), Skelbimai (advertisements).

References 

Lietuvos rytas
Lithuanian news websites